The Whitehead Research Project (WRP) is dedicated to research and scholarship on the texts, philosophy, and life of mathematician and philosopher Alfred North Whitehead. It explores and analyzes the relevance of Whitehead's thought in dialogue with contemporary philosophies in order to unfold his philosophy of organism and its consequences for our time and in relation to emerging philosophical thought.

Early History
The WRP was conceived and founded in 2005 by Roland Faber, who serves as its executive director. In February 2005, Faber proposed and installed WRP as a project of the Center for Process Studies, a faculty research center of the Claremont School of Theology since 1973, and of which Faber is a co-director. In March 2006, Faber invited Brian G. Henning to serve as the WRP's Director of Research. In July 2006, the project established an International Board of Academic Advisors.

Conferences
The WRP has held eleven conferences since December 2007 on topics ranging from Whitehead’s intersection with Badiou and Deleuze, with Judith Butler, and with Pragmatism. Most of the papers delivered at these conferences have been subsequently published in edited books in the Contemporary Whitehead Studies series.

Contemporary Whitehead Studies
In 2009, WRP founded Contemporary Whitehead Studies (CWS), an interdisciplinary book series that publishes manuscripts from scholars with contemporary and innovative approaches to Whitehead studies. As of December 2022, it includes sixteen books.

Critical Edition of Whitehead
In February 2009, the WRP announced the inauguration of the Critical Edition of Whitehead (CEW), a long-term initiative of the WRP that aims to make available the complete published and unpublished writings of Alfred North Whitehead in a single, critical edition. The early focus of the project has been to collect and publish previously unknown Whitehead materials, including the notes of Whitehead’s students taken during his classes at Harvard from 1924–1937.

In March 2014, the WRP reached an agreement with Edinburgh University Press (EUP) to publish the Critical Edition. Subsequently the first volume of student notes, which focuses on his first year teaching at Harvard, was published in 2017 as The Harvard Lectures of Alfred North Whitehead, 1924-1925: Philosophical Presuppositions of Science, edited by Paul Bogaard and Jason Bell. The second volume of lecture notes – The Harvard Lectures of Alfred North Whitehead: The General Metaphysical Problems of Science, 1925-1927, edited by Brian G. Henning, Joseph Petek, and George R. Lucas, Jr. – focuses on Whitehead’s second and third years teaching at Harvard, and was published in 2021.

The Critical Edition of Whitehead is led by General Editor George R. Lucas, Jr., Founder and Executive Editor Brian G. Henning, and Associate Editor Joseph Petek, in addition to an editorial advisory board.

Whitehead Research Library
In February 2019, the WRP established the Whitehead Research Library (WRL) as a digital platform for sharing archival materials related to Whitehead. Parts of Whitehead’s nachlass – donated to the project by his grandson in January 2019 – are freely available on the platform, with more set to be added as the collection is cataloged.

References

External links
 
 Whitehead Research Library

Philosophy organizations